The County of Marsh is a county (a cadastral division) in the southern Darling Downs region of Queensland, Australia, on the state border with New South Wales. It was named and bounded by the Governor in Council on 7 March 1901 under the Land Act 1897.

Parishes
Marsh is divided into parishes, as listed below:

References

Marsh

External links